OER Africa is an initiative of Saide, established in 2008 with support from the William and Flora Hewlett Foundation, to collaborate with higher education institutions in Africa in the development and use of Open Educational Resources (OER), to enhance teaching and learning. OER Africa's vision is to support the emergence of vibrant and sustainable African education systems and institutions that play a critical role in building and sustaining African societies and economies through free and open development and sharing of common intellectual capital. Recently, OER Africa undertook collaborative work to develop the professional competences and skills of stakeholders within African higher education institutions so that they can implement OER practices to improve the quality of teaching and learning. Currently, OER Africa is

 Developing continuous professional development (CPD) frameworks for supporting OER practices in higher education institutions in Africa. 
 Identifying, evaluating and sharing CPD OER available from institutions around the world.
 Establishing working partnerships with selected African universities to identify the most appropriate strategies to strengthen the policy and operational environments.

Regular, up-to-date communications on news and events relating to OER in African higher education are provided on the website.

OER Africa has been cited recently in EdTechHub, TESSA, Policy Commons, Open Praxis, and PLoS One

External links 
 http://www.oerafrica.org/ OER Africa's Website

Education in Africa
Open educational resources